Sander Arends and Adam Majchrowicz were the defending champions but chose not to defend their title.

Jonathan Eysseric and Édouard Roger-Vasselin won the title after defeating Johan Brunström and Andreas Siljeström 6–7(1–7), 7–6(7–3), [11–9] in the final.

Seeds

Draw

References

 Main Draw

Internationaux de Tennis de Vendee - Doubles
Internationaux de Tennis de Vendée